CKVL may represent:

 CKVL-FM 100.1, a radio station in LaSalle, Quebec, Canada
 CINF 690 AM, a defunct radio station in Montreal, Quebec, Canada that used to broadcast on 850 AM as "CKVL"
 CKOI-FM 96.9, a radio station in Montreal, Quebec, Canada that used to broadcast as "CKVL-FM"